Xenon-135 (135Xe) is an unstable isotope of xenon with a half-life of about 9.2 hours. 135Xe is a fission product of uranium and it is the most powerful known neutron-absorbing nuclear poison (2 million barns; up to 3 million barns under reactor conditions), with a significant effect on nuclear reactor operation. The ultimate yield of xenon-135 from fission is 6.3%, though most of this is from fission-produced tellurium-135 and iodine-135.

135Xe effects on reactor restart
 
In a typical nuclear reactor fueled with uranium-235, the presence of 135Xe as a fission product presents designers and operators with problems due to its large neutron cross section for absorption. Because absorbing neutrons can detrimentally affect a nuclear reactor's ability to increase power, reactors are designed to mitigate this effect; operators are trained to properly anticipate and react to these transients. In fact, during World War II, Enrico Fermi suspected the effect of Xe-135, and followed the advice of Emilio Segrè in contacting his student Chien-Shiung Wu. Wu's soon-to-be published paper on Xe-135 completely verified Fermi's guess that it absorbed neutrons and disrupted the B Reactor that was being used in their project.

During periods of steady state operation at a constant neutron flux level, the 135Xe concentration builds up to its equilibrium value for that reactor power in about 40 to 50 hours. When the reactor power is increased, 135Xe concentration initially decreases because the burn up is increased at the new higher power level. Because 95% of the 135Xe production is from decay of iodine-135, which has a 6.57 hour half-life, the production of 135Xe remains constant; at this point, the 135Xe concentration reaches a minimum. The concentration then increases to the new equilibrium level (more accurately steady state level) for the new power level in roughly 40 to 50 hours. During the initial 4 to 6 hours following the power change, the magnitude and the rate of change of concentration is dependent upon the initial power level and on the amount of change in power level; the 135Xe concentration change is greater for a larger change in power level. When reactor power is decreased, the process is reversed.

Iodine-135 is a fission product of uranium with a yield of about 6% (counting also the iodine-135 produced almost immediately from decay of fission-produced tellurium-135). This 135I decays with a 6.57 hour half-life to 135Xe. Thus, in an operating nuclear reactor, 135Xe is being continuously produced. 135Xe has a very large neutron absorption cross-section, so in the high-neutron-flux environment of a nuclear reactor core, the 135Xe soon absorbs a neutron and becomes almost-stable 136Xe. Thus, in about 50 hours, the 135Xe concentration reaches equilibrium where its creation by 135I decay is balanced with its destruction by neutron absorption.

When reactor power is decreased or shut down by inserting neutron-absorbing control rods, the reactor neutron flux is reduced and the equilibrium shifts initially towards higher 135Xe concentration. The 135Xe concentration peaks about 11.1 hours after reactor power is decreased. Since 135Xe has a 9.2 hour half-life, the 135Xe concentration gradually decays back to low levels over 72 hours.

The temporarily high level of 135Xe with its high neutron absorption cross-section makes it difficult to restart the reactor for several hours. The neutron-absorbing 135Xe acts like a control rod, reducing reactivity. The inability of a reactor to be started due to the effects of 135Xe is sometimes referred to as xenon-precluded start-up, and the reactor is said to be "poisoned out". The period of time that the reactor is unable to overcome the effects of 135Xe is called the "xenon dead time".

If sufficient reactivity control authority is available, the reactor can be restarted, but the xenon burn-out transient must be carefully managed. As the control rods are extracted and criticality is reached, neutron flux increases many orders of magnitude and the 135Xe begins to absorb neutrons and be transmuted to 136Xe. The reactor burns off the nuclear poison. As this happens, the reactivity and neutron flux increases, and the control rods must be gradually reinserted to counter the loss of neutron absorption by the 135Xe. Otherwise, the reactor neutron flux will continue to increase, burning off even more xenon poison, on a path to runaway criticality. The time constant for this burn-off transient depends on the reactor design, power level history of the reactor for the past several days, and the new power setting. For a typical step up from 50% power to 100% power, 135Xe concentration falls for about 3 hours.

Xenon poisoning was a contributing factor to the Chernobyl disaster; during a run-down to a lower power, a combination of operator error and xenon poisoning caused the reactor thermal power to fall to near-shutdown levels. The crew's resulting efforts to restore power placed the reactor in a highly unsafe configuration. A flaw in the SCRAM system inserted positive reactivity, causing a thermal transient and a steam explosion that tore the reactor apart.

Reactors using continuous reprocessing like many molten salt reactor designs might be able to extract 135Xe from the fuel and avoid these effects. Fluid fuel reactors cannot develop xenon inhomogeneity because the fuel is free to mix. Also, the Molten Salt Reactor Experiment demonstrated that spraying the liquid fuel as droplets through a gas space during recirculation can allow xenon and krypton to leave the fuel salts. However, removing xenon-135 from neutron exposure also causes the reactor to produce more of the long-lived fission product caesium-135.

Decay and capture products

A 135Xe atom that does not capture a neutron undergoes beta decay to 135Cs, one of the 7 long-lived fission products, while a 135Xe that does capture a neutron becomes almost-stable 136Xe.

The probability of capturing a neutron before decay varies with the neutron flux, which itself depends on the kind of reactor, fuel enrichment and power level; and the 135Cs / 136Xe ratio switches its predominant branch very near usual reactor conditions.
Estimates of the proportion of 135Xe during steady-state reactor operation that captures a neutron include 90%, 39%–91% and "essentially all".
For instance, in a (somewhat high) neutron flux of 1014 n·cm−2·s−1, the xenon cross section of σ =  cm2 ( barn) would lead to a capture probability of  s−1, which corresponds to a half-life of about one hour. Compared to the 9.17 hour half-life of 135Xe, this nearly ten-to-one ratio means that under such conditions, essentially all 135Xe would capture a neutron before decay. But if the neutron flux is lowered to one-tenth of this value, like in CANDU reactors, the ratio would be 50-50, and half the 135Xe would be converted into 135Cs before neutron capture.

136Xe from neutron capture ends up as part of the eventual stable fission xenon which also includes 136Xe, 134Xe, 132Xe, and 131Xe produced by fission and beta decay rather than neutron capture.

Nuclei of 133Xe, 137Xe, and 135Xe that have not captured a neutron all beta decay to isotopes of caesium. Fission produces 133Xe, 137Xe, and 135Xe in roughly equal amounts but, after neutron capture, fission caesium contains more stable 133Cs (which however can become 134Cs on further neutron activation) and highly radioactive 137Cs than 135Cs.

Spatial xenon oscillations

Large thermal reactors with low flux coupling between regions may experience spatial power oscillations because of the non-uniform presence of xenon-135. Xenon-induced spatial power oscillations occur as a result of rapid perturbations to power distribution that cause the xenon and iodine distribution to be out of phase with the perturbed power distribution. This results in a shift in xenon and iodine distributions that causes the power distribution to change in an opposite direction from the initial perturbation.

The instantaneous production rate of xenon-135 is dependent on the iodine-135 concentration and therefore on the local neutron flux history. On the other hand, the destruction rate of xenon-135 is dependent on the instantaneous local neutron flux.

The combination of delayed generation and high neutron-capture cross section produces a diversity of impacts on nuclear reactor operation. The mechanism is described in the following four steps.
 An initial lack of symmetry (for example, axial symmetry, in the case of axial oscillations) in the core power distribution (for example as a result of significant control rods movement) causes an imbalance in fission rates within the reactor core, and therefore, in the iodine-135 buildup and the xenon-135 absorption.
 In the high-flux region, xenon-135 burnout allows the flux to increase further, while in the low-flux region, the increase in xenon-135 causes a further reduction in flux. The iodine concentration increases where the flux is high and decreases where the flux is low. This shift in the xenon distribution is such as to increase (decrease) the multiplication properties of the region in which the flux has increased (decreased), thus enhancing the flux tilt.
 As soon as the iodine-135 levels build up sufficiently, decay to xenon reverses the initial situation. Flux decreases in this area, and the former low-flux region increases in power.
 Repetition of these patterns can lead to xenon oscillations moving about the core with periods on the order of about 24 hours.
With little change in overall power level, these oscillations can significantly change the local power levels. This oscillation may go unnoticed and reach dangerous local flux levels if only the total power of the core is monitored. Therefore, most PWRs use tandem power range excore neutron detectors to monitor upper and lower halves of the core separately.

See also
Isotopes of xenon
Shutdown (nuclear reactor)

References

Further reading
"Xenon Poisoning" or Neutron Absorption in Reactors

Fission products
Isotopes of xenon
Neutron poisons